Haiti: Harvest of Hope (1994)  was originally planned as a documentary about democracy coming to Haiti with the election of Jean-Bertrand Aristide in December 1990. During the final editing of the original (late September 1991) Haiti was struck by yet another military coup. Editing of the first version came to a halt as Kevin Pina (the filmmaker) returned to Haiti and spent the next three weeks chronicling the brutality and machinations of Haiti's new military leaders and their supporters.

Kevin Pina returned to Haiti in late July 1993 just after the negotiation of the Governor's Island Accord between the Haitian Government in exile and General Raoul Cédras. Pina returned again in 1994 to film Aristide's return to Haiti.

The world television premiere of Harvest of Hope was in Haiti on Mother's Day, May 28, 1995. The Haitian Creole version was produced in association with Jean-Claude Martineau who also introduced the film on Télévision Nationale d'Haïti. The English version is narrated by Roscoe Lee Browne and premiered at the Mill Valley Film Festival in the summer of 1994.

References

External links
 Haiti: Harvest of Hope on YouTube

1994 films
English-language Haitian films
American documentary films
Haitian documentary films
Haitian Creole-language films
Port-au-Prince
1990s English-language films
1990s American films